Paci is an Italian surname.  People with this name include:

Alessandro Paci (born 1964), Italian actor, film director, and comedian
Alfred Paci (born ?), Swiss curler
Francesca Paci (born 1971), Italian journalist
Frank G. Paci (born 1948), Italian-born Canadian novelist and teacher
Guido Paci (1949–1983), Italian motorcycle racer
Mario Paci (1878–1946), Italian pianist, orchestra conductor, and educator
Massimo Paci (born 1978), Italian footballer and coach
Roberto Paci Dalò (born 1962), Italian author, composer, musician, film maker, theatre director, and visual artist
Roy Paci (born 1969), Italian trumpeter, singer, composer, and arranger

See also
 PACI (disambiguation)

Italian-language surnames